is a city located in Kyoto Prefecture, Kansai, Japan. It is halfway between Kyoto and Nara. It contains historical sites including the Shibagahara Tomb and Mito shrine. The city was founded on May 3, 1972. As of October 2020, the city has an estimated population of 74,607 and a population density of 2,281 persons per km². The total area is 32.71 km².

Demographics
Per Japanese census data, the population of Jōyō has declined in recent decades.

Economy

Industry 
 Gold and silver thread
Gold and silver threads weaved into Kimono and Obi are produced at Joyo.
Joyo produces 60% of all the gold and silver thread in Japan.

Agriculture 
figs
sweet potatoes

Tourist attractions 

Shoudoukanga-iseki
Aodani plum forest 
Currently about 10,000 ume trees are planted in this 20-hectare area, considered the largest in Kyoto Prefecture. A detailed origin of this ume grove is not known. It is known that in the beginning of the Medieval era (Kamakura period, 1185-1333 AD) a prince wrote a tanka to praise this ume grove.

Culture

Sports

Soccer
Kyoto Sanga F.C.（Association football）
Sanga town Jōyō is an official training field for the Kyoto Sanga F.C., which belongs to the Japanese professional association football league, J. League.

External relations

Twin towns – Sister cities
Joyo has two sister cities:

International
Sister City
Gyeongsan（Gyeongsangbuk-do, South Korea）
Vancouver, Washington (United States）

References

External links 

  
 

Cities in Kyoto Prefecture